The Prime Minister of the Democratic Socialist Republic of Sri Lanka is the head and most senior member of parliament in the cabinet of ministers. It is the second-most powerful position in Sri Lanka's executive branch behind the president, who is the constitutional chief executive. The Cabinet is collectively held accountable to parliament for their policies and actions.

Dinesh Gunawardena has been prime minister since 22 July 2022, after Ranil Wickremesinghe was sworn in as the President.

Appointment
The president will appoint a member of parliament as prime minister, who in the president's opinion, "is most likely to command the confidence of Parliament". The prime minister holds office throughout the period during which the cabinet of ministers continues to function under the provisions of the constitution unless the prime minister resigns from the post or ceases to be a member of parliament.

Powers and role
Under the Soulbury Constitution the post of Prime Minister was created in 1947 as the head of government in the Westminster system. In 1978, under the second amendment to the Republican Constitution of 1972 much of the powers of the premiership were transferred to the executive presidency as head of government and head of the cabinet of ministers in addition to being the head of state. As a result, the prime minister became a senior member cabinet of ministers and successor to the president. The prime minister would serve as the deputy to the president if both are from the same political party. On certain occasions, when the president is not from the majority party in parliament or a national government is formed, the prime minister would be appointed from a party different from the president's. In such a situation the prime minister would serve as the de facto head of government. In 2015, the nineteenth amendment restored a certain degree of powers to the premiership.

The prime minister is the second in the order of precedence after the president and head of the cabinet of ministers. The prime minister would be a member of the constitutional council, national security council and the most senior member of the cabinet of ministers.

Head of the cabinet of ministers
As head of the cabinet of ministers, the prime minister has the power to:
 Determine the	number of Cabinet ministers and	ministries and assignment of subjects.
 Determine the	number of non-cabinet ministers and ministries and assignment of subjects.

Principal adviser to the president
By the constitution, the prime minister holds formal power to advise the president on:
 Appoint, dismiss, or accept the resignation of cabinet and non-cabinet ministers.
 Change of subjects assigned to cabinet ministers.

Presidential succession
As per the constitution, if the office of president becomes vacant, the prime minister would "act in the office of President during the period between the occurrence of such vacancy and the assumption of office by the new president and shall appoint one of the other ministers of the Cabinet to act in the office of Prime Minister". In such a situation, if the office of Prime Minister is vacant or the prime minister is unable to act, the Speaker of the Parliament shall act in the office of President instead.

The president may appoint the prime minister to exercise, perform and discharge the powers, duties and functions of the office of President for a period during the president is unable to exercise, perform and discharge the powers, duties and functions of his office due to illness, absence from Sri Lanka or any other cause.

Privileges of office

Official residence and office
The official residence of the prime minister is the Prime Minister's House most commonly referred to as Temple Trees. The prime minister has the use of The Lodge as a vacationing residence in the holiday-town of Nuwara Eliya. The Prime Minister's Office is located in the Sirimathipaya on Sir Ernest de Silva Mawatha (formerly known as Flower Road) in Colombo.

In recent years, Temple Trees has been by some presidents such as Kumaratunga and Rajapaksa from time to time, while other prime ministers such as Wickremesinghe have chosen to stay at his personal residence.

Travel
For ground travel, the prime minister uses the prime ministerial car, which is an armored black Mercedes-Benz S-Class (S600) Pullman Guard. For domestic air travel, helicopters from the No. 4 (VVIP/VIP) Helicopter Squadron of the Sri Lanka Air Force are used while for long-distance travel, regular flights of the Sri Lankan Airlines are used.

Security
Traditionally security for the prime minister has been provided by the Sri Lanka Police. After the establishment of the office of Prime Minister in 1948, a sub inspector of the Ceylon Police Force had been assigned for personal protection of the prime minister, until S. W. R. D. Bandaranaike dismissed his personal protection officer. When Bandaranaike was assassinated, only a lone police constable stood guard at the entrance of his residence. Following the Bandaranaike assassination, the successive prime ministers received a police guard headed by a sub-inspector. This was supplemented by the Army's Field Security Detachment following the 1962 attempted coup d'état and during the 1971 JVP insurrection. At present the Prime Minister's Security Division is in charge of security of the prime minister.

Order of precedence
In the Sri Lankan order of precedence, the prime minister is placed after the president, but before the Speaker of the Parliament.

History

The post of Prime Minister of Ceylon was created in 1947 replacing the colonial post of Chief Secretary of Ceylon, as Ceylon gained self-rule with the formation of the Dominion of Ceylon under the recommendations of the Soulbury Commission under the Ceylon Independence Act, 1947 and The Ceylon (Constitution and Independence) Orders in Council 1947. The D. S. Senanayake, the leader of the newly formed United National Party became the first Prime Minister. Carrying forward the scope of the former Chief Secretary, the Prime Minister retained the portfolios of External Affairs and Defence as the Minister of External Affairs and Defence.

In 1972 when Sri Lanka became a republic the name of the post changed to Prime Minister of Sri Lanka. With a Westminster-based political system established the prime minister was the head of government and therefore held the most powerful political office of the country at the time. This changed with a constitutional change in 1978, when the executive presidency was created, making the president both head of state and head of government. Until 1978, the prime minister was also the minister of defence and external affairs. The prime minister is appointed by the president as a member of the cabinet of ministers. In the event that the office of the president is vacant, the prime minister becomes the acting president until Parliament convenes to elect a successor or new elections would be held to elect a new president. This was the case with H.E. President Dingiri Banda Wijetunge. UNP leader Ranil Wickremesinghe has served as prime minister on six occasions, while former UNP leader Dudley Senanayake and former Sri Lanka Freedom Party leader Sirimavo Bandaranaike were each appointed respectively four and three times to the position. With the passing of the 19th amendment to the constitution in 2015, the prime minister was granted more powers when appointing ministers and leading the cabinet.

Major events

2018 Sri Lankan constitutional crisis

On 26 October 2018, former president Mahinda Rajapaksa was appointed by Maithripala Sirisena as the prime minister dismissing incumbent prime minister Ranil Wickremesinghe. Wickremasinghe refused to accept the dismissal stating that it was unconstitutional, resulting in a constitutional crisis.

On 3 December 2018, a court issued an interim order preventing Mahinda Rajapaksha from functioning in the position. On 16 December 2018, Ranil Wickramasinghe was re-appointed as Prime Minister ending the crisis.

2022 Sri Lankan economic and political crisis

In March 2022, Sri Lankans began protests in retaliation to the economic mismanagement of Sri Lanka, which led to the island nation's worst economic crisis since independence. The protesters blamed the Rajapaksa family who have been dominating Sri Lankan politics for decades for the economic instability of Sri Lanka. On 9 May 2022, Prime Minister Mahinda Rajapaksa, submitted his letter of resignation amidst the anti-government protests.

On 12 May 2022, President Gotabaya Rajapaksa appointed veteran politician Ranil Wickremesinghe as Prime Minister of Sri Lanka.

On 9 July 2022, protestors stormed the Presidential secretariat, Presidential house and set fire to Prime Minister Ranil Wickremesinghe house. This led President Gotabya Rajapaksa to resign and Prime minister Ranil Wickremesinghe was appointed acting president. On 20 July, Ranil Wickremesinghe was appointed President of Sri Lanka by members of parliament. On 22 July, Wickremesinghe appointed Dinesh Gunawardena as the Prime Minister of Sri Lanka.

See also
List of prime ministers of Sri Lanka

References

Notes

Citations

External links
 Sri Lankan Prime Minister's Office
Parliament of Sri Lanka - Handbook of Parliament, Prime Ministers

 
Government of Sri Lanka
1947 establishments in Ceylon